A meteor shower is a celestial event in which a number of meteors are observed to radiate, or originate, from one point in the night sky. These meteors are caused by streams of cosmic debris called meteoroids entering Earth's atmosphere at extremely high speeds on parallel trajectories. Most meteors are smaller than a grain of sand, so almost all of them disintegrate and never hit the Earth's surface. Very intense or unusual meteor showers are known as meteor outbursts and meteor storms, which produce at least 1,000 meteors an hour, most notably from the Leonids. The Meteor Data Centre lists over 900 suspected meteor showers of which about 100 are well established. Several organizations point to viewing opportunities on the Internet. NASA maintains a daily map of active meteor showers.

Historical developments

A meteor shower in August 1583 was recorded in the Timbuktu manuscripts.
In the modern era, the first great meteor storm was the Leonids of November 1833. One estimate is a peak rate of over one hundred thousand meteors an hour, but another, done as the storm abated, estimated more than two hundred thousand meteors during the 9 hours of the storm, over the entire region of North America east of the Rocky Mountains. American Denison Olmsted (1791–1859) explained the event most accurately. After spending the last weeks of 1833 collecting information, he presented his findings in January 1834 to the American Journal of Science and Arts, published in January–April 1834, and January 1836. He noted the shower was of short duration and was not seen in Europe, and that the meteors radiated from a point in the constellation of Leo. He speculated the meteors had originated from a cloud of particles in space. Work continued, yet coming to understand the annual nature of showers though the occurrences of storms perplexed researchers.

The actual nature of meteors was still debated during the 19th century. Meteors were conceived as an atmospheric phenomenon by many scientists (Alexander von Humboldt, Adolphe Quetelet, Julius Schmidt) until the Italian astronomer Giovanni Schiaparelli ascertained the relation between meteors and comets in his work  "Notes upon the astronomical theory of the falling stars" (1867). In the 1890s, Irish astronomer George Johnstone Stoney (1826–1911) and British astronomer Arthur Matthew Weld Downing (1850–1917) were the first to attempt to calculate the position of the dust at Earth's orbit. They studied the dust ejected in 1866 by comet 55P/Tempel-Tuttle before the anticipated Leonid shower return of 1898 and 1899. Meteor storms were expected, but the final calculations showed that most of the dust would be far inside Earth's orbit. The same results were independently arrived at by Adolf Berberich of the Königliches Astronomisches Rechen Institut (Royal Astronomical Computation Institute) in Berlin, Germany. Although the absence of meteor storms that season confirmed the calculations, the advance of much better computing tools was needed to arrive at reliable predictions.

In 1981, Donald K. Yeomans of the Jet Propulsion Laboratory reviewed the history of meteor showers for the Leonids and the history of the dynamic orbit of Comet Tempel-Tuttle. A graph from it was adapted and re-published in Sky and Telescope. It showed relative positions of the Earth and Tempel-Tuttle and marks where Earth encountered dense dust. This showed that the meteoroids are mostly behind and outside the path of the comet, but paths of the Earth through the cloud of particles resulting in powerful storms were very near paths of nearly no activity.

In 1985, E. D. Kondrat'eva and E. A. Reznikov of Kazan State University first correctly identified the years when dust was released which was responsible for several past Leonid meteor storms. In 1995, Peter Jenniskens predicted the 1995 Alpha Monocerotids outburst from dust trails. In anticipation of the 1999 Leonid storm, Robert H. McNaught, David Asher, and Finland's Esko Lyytinen were the first to apply this method in the West. In 2006 Jenniskens published predictions for future dust trail encounters covering the next 50 years. Jérémie Vaubaillon continues to update predictions based on observations each year for the Institut de Mécanique Céleste et de Calcul des Éphémérides (IMCCE).

Radiant point 

Because meteor shower particles are all traveling in parallel paths and at the same velocity, they will appear to an observer below to radiate away from a single point in the sky. This radiant point is caused by the effect of perspective, similar to parallel railroad tracks converging at a single vanishing point on the horizon. Meteor showers are normally named after the constellation from which the meteors appear to originate. This "fixed point" slowly moves across the sky during the night  due to the Earth turning on its axis, the same reason the stars appear to slowly march across the sky. The radiant also moves slightly from night to night against the background stars (radiant drift) due to the Earth moving in its orbit around the Sun. See IMO Meteor Shower Calendar 2017 (International Meteor Organization) for maps of drifting "fixed points."

When the moving radiant is at the highest point, it will reach the observer's sky that night. The Sun will be just clearing the eastern horizon. For this reason, the best viewing time for a meteor shower is generally slightly before dawn — a compromise between the maximum number of meteors available for viewing and the brightening sky, which makes them harder to see.

Naming 
Meteor showers are named after the nearest constellation, or bright star with a Greek or Roman letter assigned that is close to the radiant position at the peak of the shower, whereby the grammatical declension of the Latin possessive form is replaced by "id" or "ids." Hence, meteors radiating from near the star Delta Aquarii (declension "-i") are called the Delta Aquariids. The International Astronomical Union's Task Group on Meteor Shower Nomenclature and the IAU's Meteor Data Center keep track of meteor shower nomenclature and which showers are established.

Origin of meteoroid streams 

A meteor shower results from an interaction between a planet, such as Earth, and streams of debris from a comet. Comets can produce debris by water vapor drag, as demonstrated by Fred Whipple in 1951, and by breakup. Whipple envisioned comets as "dirty snowballs," made up of rock embedded in ice, orbiting the Sun. The "ice" may be water, methane, ammonia, or other volatiles, alone or in combination. The "rock" may vary in size from a dust mote to a small boulder. Dust mote sized solids are orders of magnitude more common than those the size of sand grains, which, in turn, are similarly more common than those the size of pebbles, and so on. When the ice warms and sublimates, the vapor can drag along dust, sand, and pebbles.

Each time a comet swings by the Sun in its orbit, some of its ice vaporizes, and a certain number of meteoroids will be shed. The meteoroids spread out along the entire trajectory of the comet to form a meteoroid stream, also known as a "dust trail" (as opposed to a comet's "gas tail" caused by the tiny particles that are quickly blown away by solar radiation pressure).

Recently, Peter Jenniskens has argued that most of our short-period meteor showers are not from the normal water vapor drag of active comets, but the product of infrequent disintegrations, when large chunks break off a mostly dormant comet. Examples are the Quadrantids and Geminids, which originated from a breakup of asteroid-looking objects,  and 3200 Phaethon, respectively, about 500 and 1000 years ago. The fragments tend to fall apart quickly into dust, sand, and pebbles and spread out along the comet's orbit to form a dense meteoroid stream, which subsequently evolves into Earth's path.

Dynamical evolution of meteoroid streams 

Shortly after Whipple predicted that dust particles traveled at low speeds relative to the comet, Milos Plavec was the first to offer the idea of a dust trail, when he calculated how meteoroids, once freed from the comet, would drift mostly in front of or behind the comet after completing one orbit. The effect is simple celestial mechanics – the material drifts only a little laterally away from the comet while drifting ahead or behind the comet because some particles make a wider orbit than others. These dust trails are sometimes observed in comet images taken at mid infrared wavelengths (heat radiation), where dust particles from the previous return to the Sun are spread along the orbit of the comet (see figures).

The gravitational pull of the planets determines where the dust trail would pass by Earth orbit, much like a gardener directing a hose to water a distant plant. Most years, those trails would miss the Earth altogether, but in some years, the Earth is showered by meteors. This effect was first demonstrated from observations of the 1995 alpha Monocerotids, and from earlier not widely known identifications of past earth storms.

Over more extended periods, the dust trails can evolve in complicated ways. For example, the orbits of some repeating comets, and meteoroids leaving them, are in resonant orbits with Jupiter or one of the other large planets – so many revolutions of one will equal another number of the other. This creates a shower component called a filament.

A second effect is a close encounter with a planet. When the meteoroids pass by Earth, some are accelerated (making wider orbits around the Sun), others are decelerated (making shorter orbits), resulting in gaps in the dust trail in the next return (like opening a curtain, with grains piling up at the beginning and end of the gap).  Also, Jupiter's perturbation can dramatically change sections of the dust trail, especially for a short period comets, when the grains approach the giant planet at their furthest point along the orbit around the Sun, moving most slowly. As a result, the trail has a clumping, a braiding or a tangling of crescents, of each release of material.

The third effect is that of radiation pressure which will push less massive particles into orbits further from the sun – while more massive objects (responsible for bolides or fireballs) will tend to be affected less by radiation pressure. This makes some dust trail encounters rich in bright meteors, others rich in faint meteors.
Over time, these effects disperse the meteoroids and create a broader stream. The meteors we see from these streams are part of annual showers, because Earth encounters those streams every year at much the same rate.

When the meteoroids collide with other meteoroids in the zodiacal cloud, they lose their stream association and become part of the "sporadic meteors" background. Long since dispersed from any stream or trail, they form isolated meteors, not a part of any shower. These random meteors will not appear to come from the radiant of the leading shower.

Famous meteor showers

Perseids and Leonids 

In most years, the most visible meteor shower is the Perseids, which peak on 12 August of each year at over one meteor per minute. NASA has a tool to calculate how many meteors per hour are visible from one's observing location.

The Leonid meteor shower peaks around 17 November of each year. The Leonid shower produces a meteor storm, peaking at rates of thousands of meteors per hour. Leonid storms gave birth to the term meteor shower when it was first realised that, during the November 1833 storm, the meteors radiated from near the star Gamma Leonis. The last Leonid storms were in 1999, 2001 (two), and 2002 (two). Before that, there were storms in 1767, 1799, 1833, 1866, 1867, and 1966. When the Leonid shower is not storming, it is less active than the Perseids.

See the Infographics on Meteor Shower Calendar-2021 on the right.

Other meteor showers

Established meteor showers 

Official names are given in the International Astronomical Union's list of meteor showers.

Extraterrestrial meteor showers 

Any other Solar System body with a reasonably transparent atmosphere can also have meteor showers.  As the Moon is in the neighborhood of Earth it can experience the same showers, but will have its own phenomena due to its lack of an atmosphere per se, such as vastly increasing its sodium tail.  NASA now maintains an ongoing database of observed impacts on the moon maintained by the Marshall Space Flight Center whether from a shower or not.

Many planets and moons have impact craters dating back large spans of time. But new craters, perhaps even related to meteor showers are possible. Mars, and thus its moons, is known to have meteor showers. These have not been observed on other planets as yet but may be presumed to exist. For Mars in particular, although these are different from the ones seen on Earth because of the different orbits of Mars and Earth relative to the orbits of comets. The Martian atmosphere has less than one percent of the density of Earth's at ground level, at their upper edges, where meteoroids strike; the two are more similar. Because of the similar air pressure at altitudes for meteors, the effects are much the same. Only the relatively slower motion of the meteoroids due to increased distance from the sun should marginally decrease meteor brightness. This is somewhat balanced because the slower descent means that Martian meteors have more time to ablate.

On March 7, 2004, the panoramic camera on Mars Exploration Rover Spirit recorded a streak which is now believed to have been caused by a meteor from a Martian meteor shower associated with comet 114P/Wiseman-Skiff.  A strong display from this shower was expected on December 20, 2007. Other showers speculated about are a "Lambda Geminid" shower associated with the Eta Aquariids of Earth (i.e., both associated with Comet 1P/Halley), a "Beta Canis Major" shower associated with Comet 13P/Olbers, and "Draconids" from 5335 Damocles.

Isolated massive impacts have been observed at Jupiter: The 1994 Comet Shoemaker–Levy 9 which formed a brief trail as well, and successive events since then (see List of Jupiter events.) Meteors or meteor showers have been discussed for most of the objects in the Solar System with an atmosphere: Mercury, Venus, Saturn's moon Titan, Neptune's moon Triton, and Pluto.

See also

 American Meteor Society (AMS)
 Earth-grazing fireball
 International Meteor Organization (IMO)
 List of meteor showers
 Meteor procession
 North American Meteor Network (NAMN)
 Radiant – point in the sky from which meteors appear to originate
 Zenith hourly rate (ZHR)

References

External links 

 
 Meteor Showers, by Sky and Telescope
 Six Not-So-Famous Summer Meteor Showers Joe Rao (SPACE.com)
 The American Meteor Society
 The International Meteor Organisation
 Meteor Shower Portal shows the direction of active showers each night on a celestial sphere.

 
Astronomical events of the Solar System
Atmospheric entry
Meteoroids